Timna Nelson-Levy (born 7 July 1994) is an Israeli judoka. She competes in the under 57 kg weight category, and won a bronze medal in the 2016 European Judo Championships. She competed for Israel at the 2020 Summer Olympics.

Early life
Nelson-Levy was born to Zionist American parents Shmuel and Laura who immigrated to Israel in 1985, several years prior to her birth, and resided in the capital city of Jerusalem, Israel, where she was born. Before Judo in her early teenage years, her first sports as a child were Jujutsu and mixed martial arts.

Career
On October 10, 2015, Nelson-Levy won her first significant medal in a senior competition when she won a bronze medal at the 'European Open Lisbon'.

On April 21, 2016, she participated in the European senior championships for the first time and won a bronze medal. She defeated Anna Borowska of Poland in the first round, Hedvig Karakas of Hungary in the round of 16 and lost to Nora Gjakova of Kosovo in the quarter finals. She went on to defeat Viola Waechter of Germany in the repechage and reached the bronze medal match where she defeated Helene Receveaux of France by ippon.

She represented Israel at the 2020 Summer Olympics. Competing in the women's 57 kg weight category, Nelson-Levy stated at the round of 16, beating the Serbian 2020 European under-21 champion Marica Perišić after a more than 10 minutes long match. In the quarter finals, she lost to Japanese 2018 World champion Tsukasa Yoshida. Next, Nelson-Levy faced Slovenian 2021 European championships silver medalist Kaja Kajzer, losing in golden score and finishing the competition in 7th place.

Titles
Sources:

See also
List of Jews in Sports #Judo
List of Israelis
Sports in Israel

References

External links

 
 
 Timna Nelson-Levy at the European Judo Union
 

1994 births
Living people
Israeli female judoka
European Games competitors for Israel
Judoka at the 2019 European Games
Israeli people of American-Jewish descent
Judoka at the 2020 Summer Olympics
Olympic judoka of Israel
Medalists at the 2020 Summer Olympics
Olympic medalists in judo
Olympic bronze medalists for Israel